The Dover Seawolves were an independent Junior A ice hockey team that played in the America East Hockey League. The team played home games at the Dover Ice Arena in Dover, New Hampshire.

Team history
The Seawolves franchise joined the AEHL for the league's first season in 2005 as the Exeter Seawolves, playing from 2005-2007 and in Exeter, New Hampshire. The team participated in the America East Hockey League as well as exhibition games against college teams to help players gain experience. The Dover Seawolves folded after the 2007-08 season.

Regular season records

External links
 Dover Seawolves
 AEHL.com

Ice hockey teams in New Hampshire
Ice hockey clubs established in 2005
2005 establishments in New Hampshire